Ibimirim is a city  in the state of Pernambuco, Brazil. The population in 2020, according with IBGE was 29,412 inhabitants and the total area is 1906.44 km².

Geography
 State - Pernambuco
 Region - Sertão Pernambucano
 Boundaries - Custódia and Sertânia    (N);  Inajá and Manari    (S);  Tupanatinga (E);   Floresta   (W).
 Area - 2033.59 km²
 Elevation - 401 m
 Hydrography - Moxotó River
 Vegetation - Caatinga  hiperxerófila
 Climate - semi arid - (Sertão) hot
 Annual average temperature - 24.7 c
 Distance to Recife - 331.6 km

Economy
The main economic activities in Ibimirim are based in commerce and agribusiness, especially creation of goats, sheep, pigss, cattle, donkeys, horses, chickens;  and plantations of tomatoes, beans, mangoes and bananas.

Economic indicators

Economy by Sector
2006

Health Indicators

References

Municipalities in Pernambuco